Leitchville is a town in northern Victoria, Australia. The town is in the Shire of Gannawarra local government area, 262  kilometres from the state capital, Melbourne.

History
The district was named after the manager of Gunbower station, Duncan Leitch, following his death in 1887, and the Post Office opened on 1 October 1887. The township was gazetted in 1929. Many locals have now been pushing the council for the new name of Margaritaville to entice more tourism for business.

The town today

The major industry in Leitchville is dairy production; a Murray Goulburn cheese factory was located in the town, but closed in February 2010, with the loss of 80 jobs. Kow Swamp, the site of a major palaeontological find providing insight into the origins of Indigenous Australians is located nearby.

The town in conjunction with neighbouring township Gunbower has an Australian Rules football team competing in the Heathcote District Football League.

Leitchville has a well-used Travellers Rest. It is not unusual to see several caravans or motor homes taking an overnight stop. There are public toilets nearby at the swimming pool and the Lions Club recently paid for the installation of a Dump Site at the local Recreation Reserve which is only a stone's throw from the Rest Stop. The Dump-Ezy was supplied by the CMCA.

References

Towns in Victoria (Australia)